Simon Russell is a British composer for TV and film.

He has worked on many award-winning documentaries and films including  James Bluemel's Exodus; Our Journey to Europe (2 BAFTA's, RTS Best Documentary Series 2017 & Prix Italia 2016), Havana Marking's Afghan Star, Baroque! From St Peter's to St Paul's, Pussy Riot - A Punk Prayer (Special Jury Prize at Sundance 2013 and Best Documentary at the 2013 British Independent Film Awards) and Lottie Bearshout animation (BAFTA winner 2016). He composed 52 episodes of the South Korean kids animation series Canimals. Emmy Award winner in Outstanding Music & Sound category for the Pussy Riot score 2014.

Credits

Film
 We Are Many (2014)
 Pussy Riot (Roast Beef/BBC Storyville/HBO - 2013)
 Smash And Grab (Roast Beef/BBC Storyville – 2012)
 A Whole Lott More (Flying V/Roast Beef - 2013)
 The Do Gooders (Roast Beef - 2013)
 Silencing The Song (HBO/Roast Beef – 2011)
 66 Months (Moving Target dir: James Bluemel – 2011)
 Vote Afghanistan (Roast Beef/More 4 – 2010)
 Afghan Star (Roast Beef dir: Havana Marking -2009)
 Vampire Diary (Bard/Sterling dir: Mark James – 2007)
 Weak At Denise (Guerilla Films dir: Julian Nott -2002)

Animation
 Canimals – 52 Episodes (Aardman/Voozclub/BRB)
 Lottie Bearshout – (Wildseed/Disney)

Drama
 Don't Leave Me This Way (BBC 1)
 Stand By Your Man (BBC 1)
 Desperados (BBC 1) – 10 part series
 Between The Sheets (Yorkshire) – 6 part series
 Avenging Angels (Granada)

Documentary
 Exodus: Our Journey to Europe (Keo Films/BBC 2)
 The Trapped 13; How we survived the Cave (Netflix)
 Mariupol; the people's story (TopHat/BBC 1)
 Pandemic 2020 (Keo Films/BBC 2)
 Once Upon A Time in Iraq (Keo Films/BBC 2)
 Trouble at TopShop (Voltage/BBC 2)
 Who is Ghislaine Maxwell (Roast Beef/Channel 4)
 Secrets of the Salisbury Poisonings (Discovery+)
 Outbreak: The Virus that shook the World (HardCash/ITV)
 Undercover: Inside China's Digital Gulag (HardCash/ITV)
 The Curry House Kid (Swan Films/Channel 4)
 The Battle for Hong Kong (PBS Frontline/HardCash/Channel 4)
 How to Steal Pigs and Influence People (DragonFly/Channel 4)
 Europe: 10 Years of Turmoil (Brook Lapping/BBC 2)
 Big Sky, Big Dreams, Big Art: Made in USA (ZCZ/BBC 4)
 The Renaissance Unchained (ZCZ/BBC 4)
 The Alps Murders (Rize/Channel 4)
 "Rubens: An Extra Large Story" (ZCZ/BBC 2)
 "Angry White & Proud" (Mentorn/Channel 4)
 "Holbein: Eye of the Tudors" (ZCZ/BBC 2)
 "The Billionaire Base: Dismantling Camp Bastion" (Roast Beef/Channel 4)
 "How the Wild West was won with Ray Mears" (Tin Can Island/BBC 4)
 Mothers, Murderers & Mistresses; Empresses Of Ancient Rome (Hot Sauce/BBC 4) 3 part series
 The Impressionists (ZCZ/BBC 2) 4 part series
 The Pet Detectives (Roast Beef/Channel 4)
 Cheetah Kingdom (Anglia/ITV) 12 part series
 9 Months Later (Sky Living) 6 part series
 "Animal Cops; Houston 2014" (Tin Can Island/Animal Planet)
 The Dark Ages; An Age Of Light (ZCZ/BBC 4) 4 part series
 The Miracle Baby of Haiti (Roast Beef/Channel 4)
 Invite Mr. Wright (Roast Beef/Discovery) 6 part series 1 & 2
 Win A Baby (Roast Beef/Channel 4)
 The Millionaire & the Murder Mansion (Films of Record/Channel 4)
 Ugly Beauty (ZCZ/BBC 2)
 My Boyfriend The MI5 Hoaxer (Ronachan/Channel 4)
 Islands Of Britain (ITV) 3 part series
 The Sculpture Diaries (ZCZ/Channel 4) 3 part series
 Baroque!: From St Peter's to St Paul's (ZCZ/BBC 4) 3 part series
 Out Of Bounds (Roast Beef/Travel Channel) 6 part series
 The 9/11 Faker (Films of Record/Channel 4)
 K9 Cops (Animal Planet/Granada) 15 part series
 Animal Cops; Houston (Granada/Discovery) 12 part series
 Atlas: Japan Revealed (ZCZ/Discovery)
 The Planners Are Coming (RDF/BBC 1) 8 part series
 Sudden Death (Sitting In Pictures/National Geographic)
 Sickert vs Sargent (ZCZ/More 4)
 America; The Wright Way (Roast Beef/Travel Channel)
 The Happy Dictator (ZCZ/More4)
 Kazakhstan Swings (ZCZ/More 4)
 The Black Widow (Firecracker/Channel 4)
 The New Al-Qaeda (BBC 1)
 Toulouse-Lautrec; the full story (ZCZ/Channel 4)
 The Michelangelo Code (ZCZ/Channel 4)
 Manuela Saenz (Move A Mountain)
 Paradise Found (ZCZ/Channel 4)
 Hitler's Britain (Lion TV)
 The Real 4400 (Unique/Sky)
 Picking Up The Pieces (Quality Time/Channel 4) 3 part series
 What Would Jesus Drive (Fulcrum/Channel 4)
 Grand Designs; The Stirling Prize 2004 (Talkback/Channel 4)
 Who Killed My Baby (Films Of Record/Channel 4)
 Every Picture Tells A Story (ZCZ/Five)
 Mark Thomas; Debt Collector (Just About/Channel 4)
 Building Of The Year (ZCZ/Channel 4) – 2000 – 2004
 Super Cities (ZCZ/Channel 4) – 3 part series
 The Body Jars (Becker/Discovery)
 Picasso; Magic, Sex & Death (ZCZ/Channel 4) – 3 part series
 VIP Weekends (Sitting In Pics/Firewire Films/Discovery) – 6 part series
 Chronique d'une ville occupee (Move A Mountain)

TV theme songs
 Clive Anderson Now (BBC 1)
 The People's Awards (BBC 1)
 Food Factory (ITV)
 Brian's Boyfriends (ITV)
 Style Challenge (BBC 1)
 Wrecks To Riches (ITV)
 World Cup Wondergoals (Five)

References

External links

 Roast Beef Productions

British film score composers
British male film score composers
British television composers
Living people
Year of birth missing (living people)